Ridabu is a village in Hamar Municipality in Innlandet county, Norway. The village is located at the intersection of the European route E6 highway and the Norwegian National Road 3.

The suburban village area was once its own separate village, but over time, the town of Hamar was grown and now Ridabu is considered to be the eastern part of the town of Hamar, so population statistics are no longer separately kept for Ridabu. Prior to 1992, Ridabu was a part of the rural municipality Vang.

Name
The name is very old village name. The suffix  simply means 'built', but the meaning of the first part of the name has no definite interpretation. Several old village names end in -bú, and in those cases the prefix refers to nearby place names. For example, the prefix in Selbu is named after Seli which is the original name of the lake Selbusjøen. A name of a nearby place such as  could be the source of this name. Once possibility is the noun , which means 'red', 'anchorage', or 'open harbor', or the verb , which means 'swing', 'crank', or 'anchor'. One possibility is that the nearby bay could have been historically named something like  with the meaning 'anchorage' or 'harbor'. The nearby Åker farm was an older Iron Age residence for powerful chiefs and small kings. Therefore it is likely that the meaning of the current name Ridabu was originally , which means a village 'built near Ríði' (a bay now called Åkersvika).

References

Hamar
Villages in Innlandet